Aleksandr Dmitriyevich Demenshin (born 2 September 1986) is a former Russian professional football player.

Club career
He played in the Russian Football National League for FC Nizhny Novgorod in 2009.

See also
Football in Russia

References

External links
 
 

1986 births
People from Dzerzhinsk, Russia
Living people
Russian footballers
Association football midfielders
FC Fakel Voronezh players
FC Nizhny Novgorod (2007) players
FC Torpedo NN Nizhny Novgorod players
Sportspeople from Nizhny Novgorod Oblast